Japanese occupation government may refer to:
 Philippine Executive Commission
 Any of the governments set up in China by the Imperial Japanese Army during the Second Sino-Japanese War:
 Provisional Government of the Republic of China (1937–1940), established in Beijing in 1937
 Reformed Government of the Republic of China, established in Nanjing in 1938
 Reorganized National Government of the Republic of China, established in 1940 in Nanjing

See also
 Japanese occupation (disambiguation)
 Governor-General of Karafuto
 Governor-General of Korea
 Governor-General of Kwantung
 Governor-General of Taiwan
 Mengjiang, a Japanese puppet state in Inner Mongolia set up in 1936
 Politics of Manchukuo